Abdullah Ghanem (Arabic:عبد الله غانم) (born 21 May 1995) is an Emirati footballer. He currently plays as a left back for Al-Sharjah.

External links

References

Emirati footballers
1995 births
Living people
Sharjah FC players
UAE Pro League players
Association football fullbacks
Footballers at the 2018 Asian Games
Asian Games bronze medalists for the United Arab Emirates
Asian Games medalists in football
Medalists at the 2018 Asian Games